Nature as Mother is an abstract sculpture by Adrian Reynoso, installed along Puerto Vallarta's Malecón, in the Mexican state of Jalisco. According to Fodor's, the artwork depicts "a wave with some human characteristics on a spiral shell and symbolizes the evolution of our planet with nature as the controlling force".

References

External links

 

Abstract sculpture
Centro, Puerto Vallarta
Outdoor sculptures in Puerto Vallarta
Water in art